Henry Hobart Nichols Jr. (May 1, 1869  – August 13, 1962) was an American landscape painter and illustrator. Nichols was born to Henry Hobart and Indiana Jay Nichols on May 1, 1869, in Washington, DC.

He studied under Howard Hemlock and Edmund Clarence Messer  at the Art Students League of Washington and later, completed in 1905, studies with Caludio Castelucho at the Académie Julian in Paris.

Family 
Nichols' father, Hobart Nichols Sr., was a noted wood engraver who engraved the sketches in The History of North American Birds by Baird, Brewer and Ridgeway. His mother, Indiana Jay Nichols was skilled at drawing and "interested in all things related to the arts." Hobart’s brother, Spencer Baird Nichols, was a portrait painter and illustrator.

Nichols married painter Wilhelmina von Stoschm also of Washington, DC, in 1895. They had two daughters, Hildegarde born 1896 and Leonora born in 1897. In 1908, the family moved to New York City. Then in 1910 they bought land in Lawrence Park a growing artists' colony in Bronxville, New York.

Career 
Nichols' began his career as an illustrator for the US Geological Survey where he remained for 15 years building his fine art career in his spare time.  Ultimately he became known for his landscapes rendered in oil or watercolor. His grandniece, Barbara Sussman’s description of her great uncle's work repeats the themes of so many of his viewers through his long career “Hobart’s paintings are solid and well executed, and he seldom strayed from the winter landscapes in which he found so much interest in exploring the nuances of light on snow.”

Hobart Nichols was known as much for his leadership in the art community as he was for his painting. He was president of the National Academy of Art for ten years and exhibited there, the Salmagundi Club and Grand Central Galleries many times.
Today, Nichols’ work is among the collections of the Metropolitan Museum of Art, the Smithsonian Institution the National Gallery of Art and the Phillips Collection.

Nearly blind, Nichols died in Bronxville on August 13, 1962, at the age of 9312 years after the death of his younger brother Spencer, and eight years after the death of his wife.

Awards 

 Washington Water Color Club Prize – 1895, 1901
 Second Corcoran Prize, Society of Washington Artists – 1901
 Parsons Prize, Society of Washington Artists – 1902, 1904
 First Corcoran Prize, Society of Washington Artists – 1906
 Turnbull Prize, Salmagundi Club – 1913
 National Arts Club of New York bronze medal – 1914
 Evans Prize, Salmagundi Club – 1915
 Porter Prize, Salmagundi Club – 1918
 National Arts Club of New York silver medal – 1920
 Thompson Prize, Salmagundi Club – 1920
 Second Altman Prize at the National Academy of Design – 1923
 Vezin Prize, Salmagundi Club – 1924
 First Altman Prize at the National Academy of Design – 1925
 Isidor Prize, Salmagundi Club – 1926
 Members Purchase Prize, Salmagundi Club – 1927
 National Academy of Design Prize – 1928
 Gregg Memorial Prize, National Arts Club – 1930
 First Altman Prize at the National Academy of Design – 1934
 National Academy of Design Prize – 1935
 Henry B. Snope Prize, Society of American Etchers, Inc. – 1936
 Century Club Prize – 1938
 Salmagundi Club Prize – 1939

Associations 

 Allied Artists of America
 The American Water Color Society (president, 1936–1937)
 Artists for Victory, World War II (president)
 The Century Club, NY (board of management)
 Connecticut Academy of Fine Arts
 The Cosmos Club, Washington, DC
 Grand Central Art Galleries
 Louis Comfort Tiffany Foundation (director, 1934–1959)
 The Lotos Club of New York City
 National Academy of Design (president, 1939–1949)
 National Arts Club
 National Institute of Arts and Letters
 New York Water Color Club
 North Shore Art Association
 Pennsylvania Academy of Fine Arts
 Salmagundi Club, NY (president, 1922–1924)
 Society of Washington Artists
 Washington Water Color Club

References

Further reading 
 
 
 

20th-century American painters
1869 births
1962 deaths
American illustrators
American landscape painters
American male painters
Painters from New York (state)
20th-century American male artists